The 1987 Tour of Britain was the inaugural edition of the Kellogg's Tour of Britain cycle race and was held from 12 August to 16 August 1987. The race started in Edinburgh and finished in London. The race was won by Joey McLoughlin of the ANC–Halfords team.

Route

General classification

References

Further reading

1987
Tour of Britain
Tour of Britain
August 1987 sports events in the United Kingdom